Hits! is the only compilation album by the Belgian Eurodance singer Kim Kay, released on 20 November 2000. The album was produced by Phil Sterman and Lov Cook and was recorded at Electric City. It features the artist's singles: "La Dah-li-danse", "Les Vacances d'été", "Ça plane pour moi", and "Les Sucettes".

Some of the songs from Kim Kay's previous debut album La Vie en lilali are retained from the Hits!.

Track listing

References

External links
 
 

2000 albums
Kim Kay albums
EMI Records albums
French-language albums